Karl Brown (December 26, 1896 – March 25, 1990) was an American cinematographer, screenwriter, and film director. He was also a member of the American Society of Cinematographers and served as vice president from 1924 to 1925.

Career
Brown's first entertainment-related job, while still in his teens, was working at a development lab for the U.S. branch of the Kinemacolor Film Company in Los Angeles. Brown was 17 when renowned film director D.W. Griffith and his crew came to take over the Kinemacolor Film Company in 1913.  Brown got in touch with camera man G.W. Bitzer and soon after became his assistant.   Brown assisted Bitzer during the filming of The Birth of a Nation (1915) and Intolerance (1916).  His duties consisted of loading the camera with film, carrying the camera, and operating a second camera during the Ride of the Clan and the Fall of Babylon scenes.  After the collapse of Kinemacolor, he worked as a still photographer on The Spoilers (1914), having become enamored with Griffith's work, especially The Battle at Elderbush Gulch (1913),

The most successful film Brown worked on as cinematographer was the James Cruze film The Covered Wagon (1923). Brown's first directorial effort, Stark Love (1927), is today considered a rural cinematic masterpiece.

Brown was cinematographer on Wallace Reid's last film, Thirty Days (1922). In the 1970s, Brown was one of the Hollywood pioneers interviewed by Kevin Brownlow for Brownlow's television series Hollywood (1980). In the series, Brown talked at length about Reid's addiction and death.

Personal life
Brown was the son of comedian and character actor William H. Brown. His mother, who styled herself Lucille Browne professionally, served as a chaperone and guardian to actresses at the Fine Arts Studio and made some film appearances.

He was married to Edna Mae Cooper from 1922 until her death in 1986.

Partial filmography

Stage Struck (1917)
Her Official Fathers (1917)
Gasoline Gus (1921)
Crazy to Marry (1921)
Is Matrimony a Failure? (1922)
The Dictator (1922)
Thirty Days (1922)
The Covered Wagon (1923)
Hollywood (1923)
To the Ladies (1923)
Leap Year (1924)
The Fighting Coward (1924)
The Enemy Sex (1924)
Merton of the Movies (1924)
Welcome Home (1925)
The Pony Express (1925)
Beggar on Horseback (1925)
Mannequin (1926)
Stark Love (1927) (as director)
The Mississippi Gambler (1929)
Prince of Diamonds (1930)
Flames (1932)
Federal Bullets (1937)
Under the Big Top (1938) (as director)
Numbered Woman  (1938) (as director)
The Man They Could Not Hang (1939) (screenplay)

References

External links
 

1896 births
1990 deaths
American cinematographers
American male screenwriters
Screenwriters from Pennsylvania
Film directors from Pennsylvania
People from McKeesport, Pennsylvania
20th-century American male writers
20th-century American screenwriters